Nicole Emmanuel (born 4 June 1986) is an English former football right-back. She played for Blackburn Rovers Ladies, having previously played in the FA Women's Premier League for Leeds Carnegie. She hails from Milton Keynes.

Club career
Having been a junior with Arsenal Ladies, Emmanuel joined Leeds Carnegie in the 2003 close-season and became a regular in the Leeds side. She played in the 2006 Women's FA Cup Final (a 5–0 defeat against Arsenal) and in the 2007 Women's FA Premier League Cup, before suffering a cruciate ligament injury. Despite still recovering from the injury, she joined Blackburn Rovers Ladies in August 2009.

University playing career
Emmanuel attended Loughborough University while playing for Leeds, playing in the University side that retained the BUSA Championship in May 2007, with Emmanuel scoring the opening goal. In July 2007 she was selected for the Great Britain Women's Football Squad for the World University Games in Bangkok. She appeared as a substitute (for Shelly Cox) in Great Britain's opening match, a 1–0 defeat against China. She started the final group game, a 6–2 win against South Africa, although was substituted by Dunia Susi early in the second half.

International career
Emmanuel has represented England at youth level. In September 2004, she was selected for England's Under-19 squad for the UEFA Under-19 Women's Championship First Qualifying Stage, starting the opening game, a 4–0 win against Moldova. In July 2005 she started the Euro Under-19 Championship Finals games against Scotland and Russia.
In February 2008, Emmanuel played for the England Under-23 side against Germany.

Personal life
Emmanuel's parents have both been involved with football teams, her mother with Berhamstead Ladies and her father with Watford and Harrow. As well as playing football, Emmanuel is also a qualified referee for Bedfordshire County FA.

Statistics
To 28 October 2009

References

People from Milton Keynes
English women's footballers
Leeds United Women F.C. players
Blackburn Rovers L.F.C. players
Alumni of Loughborough University
FA Women's National League players
Living people
1986 births
England women's under-23 international footballers
Women's association football fullbacks
Footballers from Buckinghamshire